Margaret Richardson (born  Margaret Craig) is a Scottish curler and curling coach.

Personal life
Richardson began curling at age 17. She is a certified accountant and runs an insurance broking business with her husband. She has two daughters.

Teams

References

External links

Living people
Scottish female curlers
Scottish curling champions
Year of birth missing (living people)